The 2003 Cheltenham & Gloucester Trophy was an English county cricket tournament, held between 29 August 2002 and 30 August 2003. The competition was won by Gloucestershire who beat Worcestershire by 7 wickets at Lord's.

Format
The eighteen first-class counties were joined in the tournament by 20 Minor Counties (Bedfordshire, Berkshire, Buckinghamshire, Cambridgeshire, Cheshire, Cornwall, Cumberland, Devon, Dorset, Herefordshire, Hertfordshire, Lincolnshire, Norfolk, Northumberland, Oxfordshire, Shropshire, Staffordshire, Suffolk, Wales Minor Counties and Wiltshire), as well as Huntingdonshire. The cricket boards of Durham, Derbyshire, Essex, Gloucestershire, Hampshire, Kent, Lancashire, Leicestershire, Middlesex, Northamptonshire, Nottinghamshire, Somerset, Surrey, Sussex, Warwickshire, Worcestershire and Yorkshire also took part, as did the national teams of Denmark, Ireland, the Netherlands and Scotland.

The tournament was a knockout with four rounds before the quarter-final and semi-final stages. The first and second rounds, which did not involve the first-class counties, were played in August and September 2002.  The winners of the semi-finals went on to the final at Lord's which was held on 30 August 2003.

Fixtures

First round

Second round

Third round

Fourth round

Quarter-finals

Semi-finals

Final

References

External links
Cricinfo tournament page

Friends Provident Trophy seasons
Cheltenham andAmp Gloucester Trophy, 2003